Des Dickson may refer to:

 Des Dickson (Australian footballer) (born 1941), Australian rules footballer
 Des Dickson (footballer, born 1948), Northern Irish footballer and manager